The Dwarf and the Giant (French: Nain et géant) is a 1901 French silent short film directed by and starring Georges Méliès. It is the earliest known film depicting a person shrinking down.

Plot
A man, portrayed by Méliès, is split into two figures: an augmented and a shrunken version of himself. Méliès starts  standing in front of a doorway before the split, and his giant self and dwarf engage in jocularity, before moving back into the doorway and going their separate ways.

Production
Special effects were used to split the actor into two figures.

References

External links
 

1901 films
1901 short films
French silent short films
1900s French films